The Huey P. Long - O.K. Allen Bridge (locally known as the Old Bridge) is a truss cantilever bridge over the Mississippi River carrying US 190 (Airline Highway) and one rail line between East Baton Rouge Parish, Louisiana and West Baton Rouge Parish, Louisiana.

Although the bridge is named after former Louisiana governors Huey P. Long and Oscar K. Allen, it is known locally in the Baton Rouge Area as "the old bridge".

It was the only bridge across the Mississippi in Baton Rouge from its opening until April 1968, when the Horace Wilkinson Bridge ("the new bridge") carrying Interstate 10 opened. Until 2011, when the John James Audubon Bridge opened between St. Francisville and New Roads, it was the last bridge crossing the Mississippi before the Natchez-Vidalia Bridge, almost 100 miles to the north.

Design

The bridge is similar in design to the Huey P. Long Bridge in Jefferson Parish, Louisiana (until the downstream bridge was widened to six lanes in 2013).  Its lanes are narrow and during cold weather, it has a tendency to ice over.

Due to the low height of the bridge, Baton Rouge is the furthest inland port on the Mississippi River that can accommodate ocean-going tankers and cargo carriers. The ships transfer their cargo (grain, oil, cars, containers) at Baton Rouge onto rails and pipelines (to travel east–west) or barges (to travel north). In addition, the river depth decreases significantly just to the north, near Port Hudson.

State of repair

The bridge itself is currently in a poor state of repair; the girder foundations on both railroad approach spans are beginning to show hairline cracks, but engineers have assured the city that the bridge is not in any imminent danger.

The bridge has been repainted several times since its construction, including in the mid-1960s when the bridge was repainted orange; this was done to match the color of dust being emitted by the Kaiser Aluminum plant on the southeast bank of the river, which continually coated the bridge with aluminum oxide (bauxite) dust. It was widened in 1989, and again repainted between 2014 and 2016 to its original color of light gray.

Planned Interstate 410
The bridge was once planned as part of an Interstate 410.

Accidents
Only one person is reported to have driven off the edge of the bridge. In 1945, a cargo truck driver headed eastbound careened off the sides. The driver fell through the windshield and was crushed on a dock as his truck landed on top of him. The scars from the accident can still be seen on the dock to one's right approaching the east end of the eastbound span.

In popular culture
The bridge is featured in a scene in the 1982 Richard Pryor film, The Toy.

See also
 
 
 
 List of crossings of the Lower Mississippi River
 Kaiser Aluminum plant

References

Truss bridges in the United States
Bridges over the Mississippi River
Bridges completed in 1940
Road-rail bridges in the United States
Road bridges in Louisiana
Railroad bridges in Louisiana
Bridges of the United States Numbered Highway System
Great River Road
Huey Long
Cantilever bridges in the United States
Buildings and structures in East Baton Rouge Parish, Louisiana
Buildings and structures in West Baton Rouge Parish, Louisiana